Aristide Pozzali (12 October 1931 – 16 January 1979) was an Italian boxer. He competed in the men's flyweight event at the 1952 Summer Olympics. At the 1952 Summer Olympics, he defeated Andrew Reddy of Ireland, before losing to Anatoli Bulakov of the Soviet Union.

References

1931 births
1979 deaths
Italian male boxers
Olympic boxers of Italy
Boxers at the 1952 Summer Olympics
Sportspeople from Cremona
Mediterranean Games medalists in boxing
Flyweight boxers
Mediterranean Games gold medalists for Italy
Boxers at the 1951 Mediterranean Games
20th-century Italian people